Paulo Lima may refer to:

 Paulo Lima (footballer, born 1992)
 Paulo Lima (footballer, born 1998)
 Paulo Costa Lima
 Paulo Lima Amaral

See also 

 Lima (surname)